The manosphere is a collection of websites, blogs, and online forums promoting masculinity, misogyny, and opposition to feminism. Communities within the manosphere include men's rights activists, incels (involuntary celibates), Men Going Their Own Way (MGTOW), pick-up artists (PUA), and fathers' rights groups.

The manosphere overlaps with the far-right and alt-right communities. It has also been associated with online harassment and has been implicated in radicalizing men into misogynist beliefs and the glorification of violence against women. Some sources have associated manosphere-based radicalization with mass shootings motivated by misogyny.

History 
The manosphere grew out of social movements such as the men's liberation movement of the 1970s and 80s. Groups now considered to be a part of the manosphere, such as the men's rights movement, predate the term "manosphere". The term, a play on the word "blogosphere", is believed to have first appeared on Blogspot in 2009. It was subsequently popularized by Ian Ironwood, a pornography marketer who collected a variety of blogs and forums in book form as The Manosphere: A New Hope For Masculinity. The term entered the popular lexicon when news media began to use it in stories about men who had committed acts of misogynist violence, sexual assault, and online harassment.

Emma A. Jane identifies the late 2000s–early 2010s as a "tipping point" when manosphere communities moved from the fringes of the Internet towards the mainstream. She hypothesizes this was related to the advent of Web 2.0 and the rise of social media, in combination with ongoing systemic misogyny within a patriarchal culture. Jane writes that the manosphere was well established by the time of the GamerGate controversy in 2014, and misogynistic language such as graphic rape threats against women had entered mainstream discourse, being deployed by men not necessarily identified with any specific manosphere group.

Ideology and content 
The manosphere is a heterogeneous group of online communities that includes men's-rights activists (MRAs), incels (involuntary celibates), Men Going Their Own Way (MGTOW), pick-up artists (PUAs), and fathers' rights groups.
Some groups within the manosphere have adversarial relationships with one another. According to media scholar Debbie Ging, subgroups such as MRAs and PUAs "exaggerate their differences in displays of infight posturing, in spite of the fact that their philosophies are almost identical".

While the specifics of each group's ideology sometimes conflict, the general ideology of manosphere groups centers on the promotion of masculinity, strong opposition to feminism, and misogyny. In particular, feminists are portrayed as ignoring male victims of sexual assault and encouraging false rape accusations against men. Journalist Caitlin Dewey argues that the main tenets of the manosphere can be reduced to (1) the corruption of modern society by feminism, in violation of inherent sex differences between men and women; and (2) the ability of men to save society or achieve sexual prowess by adopting a hyper-masculine role and forcing women to submit to them. Criminologist Lisa Sugiura writes that disparate groups within the manosphere are "united by the central belief that feminine values, propelled by feminism, dominate society and promote a 'misandrist' ideology that needs to be overthrown". 
Tracie Farrell of Open University and colleagues write that in addition to the "angry white men" associated with the alt-right, the manosphere also contains "men of colour, struggling with systemic racism that extends to beauty ideals and status".

Jargon 
The manosphere has its own distinct jargon. The idea of misandry (hatred of or prejudice against men) is commonly invoked, both as an equivalent to misogyny and a way to deny the existence of institutionalized sexism. A central tenet is the concept of the red pill, a metaphor borrowed from the film The Matrix. It concerns awakening men to the supposed reality that society is dominated by feminism and biased against men. Manospherians believe that feminists and political correctness obscure this reality, and that men are victims who must fight to protect themselves. Accepting the manosphere's ideology is equated with "taking the red pill", and those who do not are seen as "blue pilled" or as having "taken the blue pill". Such terminology originated on the antifeminist subreddit /r/TheRedPill and was later taken up by men's rights and MGTOW sites. Donna Zuckerberg writes, "The Red Pill represents a new phase in online misogyny. Its members not only mock and belittle women; they also believe that in our society, men are oppressed by women."

Men are commonly divided into "alpha" and "beta" males within an evolutionary-psychology framework, where "alphas" are seen as sexually dominant and attractive to women, who are hardwired to want sex with alphas but will pair with "beta" males for financial benefits. Among MRAs and PUAs this argument is known as "alpha fux beta bux".

Associated movements 
The manosphere overlaps with white-supremacist and far-right ideologies, including the neoreactionary, white-nationalist alt-right movement. Zuckerberg writes that many alt-right members are either pick-up artists or MGTOW, and "the policing of white female sexuality is a major concern" of the alt-right. The severity of the antifeminism espoused within these communities varies, with some espousing fairly mild sexism and others glorifying extreme misogyny. Racism and xenophobia are also common among groups in the manosphere, and perceived threats against Western civilization are a popular topic.

Radicalization and violence 
The manosphere has been associated with online harassment, radicalizing men into misogynist beliefs and the glorification of violence against women. Some sources have associated manosphere-based radicalization with mass shootings motivated by misogyny. Robin Mamié of École Polytechnique Fédérale de Lausanne and colleagues associate radicalization into far-right ideologies via the manosphere with the idea of the alt-right pipeline.

Websites
The manosphere comprises various websites, blogs, and online forums. Noted sites include /r/TheRedPill, Return of Kings, and A Voice for Men, as well as (the now-defunct) PUAHate and SlutHate.

Reddit has been a popular gathering place for manosphere supporters, and several forums on the site are geared toward its ideas. However, in the late 2010s and 2020s Reddit began to take steps to discourage more extreme manosphere subreddits. Some were banned, such as /r/incels (banned in 2017), its successor /r/braincels (banned in 2018), and /r/MGTOW (banned in August 2021); other subreddits such as /r/TheRedPill have been "quarantined", meaning that a warning is displayed to users about the content of the subreddit and users must sign in before they're allowed to enter. As a result, some of these communities have found new homes on websites that are more welcoming of extreme content, such as Gab.

Public perception

The manosphere has received significant coverage in the media from its association with high-profile violent attacks including the 2014 Isla Vista killings in California, the 2015 Umpqua Community College shooting in Oregon, and the 2018 Toronto van attack, as well as phenomena such as the sustained online abuse towards female members of the video game community that came to be known as GamerGate. Following the Isla Vista shooting, the killer Elliot Rodger was found to have been an active participant on the PUAHate manosphere forum. Following the attack, Dewey wrote that, while the manosphere was not to blame for Rodger's attack, "Rodger's misogynistic rhetoric seems undeniably influenced by the manosphere". The sociologist Michael Kimmel argued "it would be facile to argue the manosphere ... urged [Rodger] to do this. I think those places are kind of a solace ... They provide a kind of locker room, a place where guys can gripe about all the bad things that are being done to them by women".

Arthur Goldwag described the manosphere in the Spring 2012 edition of the Southern Poverty Law Center's Intelligence Report as an "underworld of misogynists, woman-haters whose fury goes well beyond criticism of the family court system, domestic violence laws, and false rape accusations... [who are] devoted to attacking virtually all women (or, at least, Westernized ones)." He added a caveat later that year, saying, "It should be mentioned that the SPLC did not label MRAs as members of a hate movement; nor did our article claim that the grievances they air on their websites – false rape accusations, ruinous divorce settlements and the like – are all without merit. But we did call out specific examples of misogyny and the threat, overt or implicit, of violence." In 2018, the SPLC added male supremacy as a category they track on their list of hate groups. The British anti-extremism group Hope not Hate included the manosphere in its 2019 State of Hate report.

See also 

 Bro culture
 Complementarianism
 Hegemonic masculinity
 Identity politics
 Lad culture
 Masculism
 Jesse Lee Peterson
 The Red Pill
 Andrew Tate 
 Toxic masculinity

Citations

General and cited references

Further reading 
 
 
 
 

 
2000s neologisms
Blogospheres
Cyberbullying
Gender-related violence
Internet culture
Internet-related controversies
Masculinity
Men and feminism
Men's rights
Misogyny
Opposition to feminism
Social issues
Social psychology